Julius Maddox (born 13 May 1987) is an American powerlifter who is the world record holder in the bench press.

Records
On August 31, 2019 Julius Maddox pressed  with wrist wraps and without a belt, surpassing the  record of Kirill Sarychev.

On November 17, 2019, Maddox pressed  with wrist wraps and without a belt, breaking his own world record.

Maddox also holds the official world record for most times bench pressing  in official powerlifting competition, with 10 times.

On February 21, 2021 Julius broke another All Time World Record at 782 lbs (355 kg) at a Ghost Strong meet in Miami Florida.

Gym lifts
In February 2020 Maddox benched  in the gym, sharing it in a post on Instagram. In May 2021, Maddox benched 795lbs during a training session.

On May 10, 2022, Maddox pressed 796lbs (361kg) in his gym, which is 14lbs above the current world record.

Personal life

Maddox was born and raised in Owensboro, KY, where he still lives with his wife Heaven and their four children. In high school, Maddox was recruited for football by several top Division-1 programs, but faced troubles with drug addiction, depression, and jail time. Because of this, Maddox eventually faced a choice between two 5-year prison sentences or entering a recovery program. Maddox entered the recovery program, where he found a set of weights and began his powerlifting journey.

Maddox had been lifting for around seven years at the time he set the world bench press record. Maddox credits lifting weights in helping him overcome his addictions and problems.

Maddox has stated that one of his personal inspirations is C.T. Fletcher. His progressive goal is to bench press 800lbs. (363 kg)

See also
 Progression of the bench press world record
 List of powerlifters

References

American powerlifters
American strength athletes
Living people
1987 births
People from Owensboro, Kentucky